Schlei-Ostsee is an Amt ("collective municipality") in the district of Rendsburg-Eckernförde, in Schleswig-Holstein, Germany. Its seat is in Eckernförde, itself not part of the Amt. It was formed on 1 January 2008 from the former Ämter Schlei, Schwansen and Windeby.

The Amt Schlei-Ostsee consists of the following municipalities:

References

Ämter in Schleswig-Holstein